Swapna Barman (born 29 October 1996) is an Indian heptathlete. She won the gold medal at 2018 Asian Games and placed first in the Heptathlon at the 2017 Asian Athletics Championships. In August 2019, she was honoured with the Arjuna Award. In 2022 she took gold medals in the high jump and the heptathlon at the National games.

Life
Barman was born in Ghospara village near Jalpaiguri, West Bengal in 1996 in a poor Rajbongshi family. She is unusual in having six toes on each foot. Her mother Basana worked on a tea estate and her father, Panchanan Barman, was a rickshaw driver. and is bed-ridden after having suffered a stroke in 2013, making life tricky for his four children. She found it difficult to find the right food and her unusual feet caused her pain because she could not afford extra wide running shoes.  Swapna uses her prize money to look after her family who live in a house without a concrete wall. In 2016 she won a scholarship of 1,50,000 rupees in recognition of the success she had at athletics. She trains at the Sports Authority of India campus at Kolkata.

In 2016, she was supported by the GoSports Foundation through the Rahul Dravid Athlete Mentorship Programme.

Barman won the gold at 2018 Asian Games, she accomplished this despite a jaw injury. Barman collapsed during the final event of the 2017 Asian Athletics Championships – Women's heptathlon which was the 800 metres where she was fourth. However Barman had broken many of her personal records and she had gained enough points from the previous six events to take gold.

In 2020 she lost out on funding but said that she would continue to train at her home in Jalpaiguri, West Bengal.

She took gold in the heptathlon at the 2021 Federation Cup Senior Athletics Championships and
in 2022 she competed at the National Games in the heptathlon. She gained an unexpected gold when she broke the high jump games record with a height of 1.83m. She was also in first place in the javelin and the 100m hurdles. She won the gold for the heptathlon and hinted that she would have scored even higher of she had a sponsor for support staff.

Achievements 
Asian Athletics Championships

Federation cup

Asian Games

Rewards for winning the gold medal at the 2018 Asian Games
  from the Government of West Bengal.

References

1996 births
Living people
Sportswomen from West Bengal
People from Jalpaiguri
Indian heptathletes
Athletes (track and field) at the 2014 Asian Games
Athletes (track and field) at the 2018 Asian Games
Medalists at the 2018 Asian Games
Asian Games gold medalists for India
Asian Games medalists in athletics (track and field)
Rajbongshi people
Recipients of the Arjuna Award
Asian Games gold medalists in athletics (track and field)
People with polydactyly